Arthur Campbell Garden (August 9, 1860 – May 19, 1927) was an Ontario businessman. He represented Hamilton West in the Legislative Assembly of Ontario from 1923 to 1926 as a Conservative member.

Early life
Born in Stamford in Welland County, Garden received his schooling in Thorold. After marrying in 1884, he moved to Barrie to work as a commercial traveller for Dominion Drug. He was known for joining many local philanthropic activities.

Political life

Municipal
Garden was first elected as a councillor in Barrie's 1893 election, and later returned to be elected alderman in 1906. He was subsequently acclaimed in the next four elections, as Deputy-Reeve in 1907 and as Reeve in 1908–1910, thus becoming involved in Simcoe County politics. The Barrie Examiner noted in 1910 that "his name has been mentioned in connection with the nomination for the Legislature." During his time on County Council, he was chairman of the committee that was responsible for the publication of a history of the county.

In 1910, he was named Warden of Simcoe County, but the Northern Advance noted that "It was the most strenuous contest seen in years." It took eight ballots for him to finally win.

After 1910, he was transferred to Hamilton to become a manager at National Drug & Chemical, as Dominion Drug was now known as.

Provincial
In both Barrie and Hamilton, Garden was a Conservative who was actively involved in provincial politics. He would be elected to the Legislative Assembly of Ontario in the 1923 election, but declined to seek reelection in 1926 because of ill health.

He died in Hamilton in May 1927.

Notes and references

Notes

References

External links

1860 births
1927 deaths
Progressive Conservative Party of Ontario MPPs
People from Niagara Falls, Ontario
Politicians from Simcoe County